Diploptalis is a genus of moths of the family Crambidae. It contains only one species, Diploptalis metallescens, which is found in Nigeria.

References

Endemic fauna of Nigeria
Crambinae
Crambidae genera
Taxa named by George Hampson
Monotypic moth genera